County Line: No Fear is a 2022 American action film and the third installment of the County Line film series. Tom Wopat returns as Sheriff Alden Rockwell, with the film airing on the INSP network. It was released exclusively for streaming on Vudu in December 2022, with the DVD version of the film expected to be released in April 2023.

Plot
Sheriff Alden Rockwell has his retirement interrupted when an organised crime gang begins to scale up its operations in a neighboring county and threatens the family of Jo Porter. Tom Wopat reprises the role of Rockwell, and Kelsey Crane again Sheriff Jo Porter. Rockwell aims to help out to protect the future of both counties.

Main Cast
 Tom Wopat as Alden Rockwell
 Kelsey Crane as Joanne Porter
 Denim Richards as Dante Hill
 Patricia Richardson as Maddie
 Casper Van Dien as Zed Dalton
 Abbi Butler as Ember Rockwell
 Joseph Curtis Callender as Agent Pierson

Production & release
Production of No Fear was announced in August 2021, along with a list of other films to be filmed in Wilmington, North Carolina. Senator Roy Cooper commented on County Line: No Fear as one of the films helping the growth of the film industry in NC. The official trailer for the film was released in December 2022.

Reception
ActionReloaded gave the film a positive review, receiving a verdict of 4.5 out of 5 stars.

References

2022 films
INSP Films